Penstemon cyanocaulis, the bluestem penstemon or bluestem beardtongue, is a perennial plant in the plantain family (Plantaginaceae) found in the Colorado Plateau and Canyonlands region of the southwestern United States.

Description

Growth pattern

Leaves and stems
Stems are smooth with narrow inversely lanceolate  leaves.

Inflorescence and fruit
It blooms from April to July.

Fruits are woody capsules.

Habitat and range

Ecological and human interactions
"Cyan" + "caul" means "blue" + "stem", referring to the stem color.

It is pollinated by bees and other insects.

References

cyanocaulis
Flora of Colorado
Flora of Utah
Flora without expected TNC conservation status